A Sahasra (Sanskrit: सहस्र) is a Vedic measure of Count data, which was chiefly used in ancient as well as medieval India. A Sahasra means 1k, i.e. 1000 count data

See also

Hindu cosmology
History of measurement systems in India
Hindu units of time
Palya
Rajju
Sayana
List of numbers in Hindu scriptures

References

Customary units in India
Hindu astronomy
Obsolete units of measurement
Units of length